is a railway station on the Yahiko Line in the city of Tsubame, Niigata, Japan operated by East Japan Railway Company (JR East).

Lines
Nishi-Tsubame Station is served by the Yahiko Line, and is 8.0 kilometers from the terminus of the line at Yahiko Station.

Station layout
The station consists of one side platform serving a single bi-directional track. The station is unattended.

History
Nishi-Tsubame Station opened on 25 December 1954. With the privatization of Japanese National Railways (JNR) on 1 April 1987, the station came under the control of JR East.

Surrounding area
 
 Nishi-Tsubame Post Office

See also
 List of railway stations in Japan

External links

  

Railway stations in Niigata Prefecture
Railway stations in Japan opened in 1954
Stations of East Japan Railway Company
Yahiko Line
Tsubame, Niigata